National Arts Center, National Arts Centre, etc. may refer to:
 National Arts Centre (performing arts organisation) in Ottawa, Ontario, Canada
 National Arts Centre (buildling) in Ottawa, Ontario, Canada
 The National Art Center, Tokyo, also known as The National Art Center, in Japan
 National Arts Center in Los Baños, Laguna, Philippines